Persepolis B Football Club (Persian: باشگاه فوتبال پرسپولیس ب) is an Iranian professional football team based in Tehran, Iran. They are the reserve and second team of Persepolis The club was refounded in 2016 after being inactive for three years.

History
The club was founded in 2009 as the reserve or second team of Persepolis signing talented youth players of the club. They became champion of Tehran Province League and promoted to 3rd Division. Esmaeil Halali was named head coach on 12 November 2010, replacing Hossein Abdi. In July 2013, C team and former first-team manager Vinko Begović was promoted as B team's head coach but he resigned three months later to become head coach of an Azadegan League side club. Former team captain Mojtaba Moharrami was appointed as team's head coach on 30 October 2013. In 2013 due to financial issues the club decided to temporarily disband the team and instead Persepolis' young talents played for the U–21's.

Re-establishment
In 2016 the club announced that it would restart the B team for the 2016–17 season. Persepolis B played their first friendly match on 30 May 2016 in a 1–1 draw against the Iran University national football team.

Current squad

For more on the reserve and academy squads, see Persepolis Academy & Persepolis Qaem Shahr

Season-by-season
The table below chronicles the achievements of Persepolis Novin  in various competitions since 2011.

 Managerial history 
Reserves Team
  Mehrdad Minavand (2009)
  Hossein Abdi (2009–2010)
  Esmaeil Halali (2010–2013)
  Mojtaba Moharrami (2013)
  Hossein Abdi (2016–)

Notable players
  Ahmad Ahi
  Shahryar Fakhimi
  Mehdi Khakpour

Achievements

Reserves
Tehran Provincial LeagueWinners: 2011–12

Tehran Hazfi CupWinners'': 2011–12

References

External links

Official
  Official club website

News
  Club News website
  Goal.com page

Reserves
Reserve team football in Iran
1964 establishments in Iran
Association football clubs established in 1964